Clive Anthony Day (born 27 January 1961) is an English former professional footballer who played in the Football League for Aldershot, Fulham and Mansfield Town.

References

1961 births
Living people
English footballers
Association football defenders
English Football League players
Fulham F.C. players
Mansfield Town F.C. players
Aldershot F.C. players
Dagenham F.C. players
Grays Athletic F.C. players